Otonti Amadi Nduka (born 9 May 1926) is a Nigerian educationalist and Ikwerre ethnic nationality spokesman. He is married to Pamela Nduka and together they have 5 children. Otonti and his wife are still currently residing in Nigeria. They celebrated their diamond wedding anniversary in 2018.

Nduka is a retired professor and Dean of Education at the University of Port Harcourt, and a Fellow and Vice President of Nigerian Academy of Education. He also is considered a Chief by people in his village and this was evident at his 80th birthday celebrations with the many people gathering to celebrate the event and honor his work. A few days before his 80th birthday was the release of another of his works, "The Roots of African Underdevelopment". The launch of the book was held at the University of Port Harcourt.

Bibliography
Western Education and Nigerian Cultural Background, (1964) Ibadan: Oxford University Press.  
Philosophy of Education– A Missing Link in the Academic Training of Nigerian Teachers in Yoloye, E.A. and Nwosu, S.N. (eds) Foundations of African Education, Volume 1 (1975) Accra Western Council of the Association for Teacher Education in Africa Originally Published in Proceedings of the Conference on High Level Teacher Training, (1970), Lagos: Federal Ministry of Information
A Review of Educational Developments in Federal Republic of Nigeria in 1975 in Oyediran, O. (ed): Survey of Nigerian Affairs 1975, Ibadan: Oxford University Press
Educational Development in Port Harcourt: Retrospect and Prospects, in Ogionwo, W. (ed) The City of Port Harcourt: Symposium on Its Growth and Development (1979) Ibadan, Heinemann
With Iheoma, O.A. (eds) New Perspectives in Moral Education, (1983) Evans Brothers (Nig) Ltd. 
Studies in Ikwerre History and Culture, (1993) Ibadan, Kraft Books. 
The Roots of African Underdevelopment, (2006) Ibadan, Spectrum Books.

References 

1926 births
Living people
Ikwerre people
Educators from Rivers State
Academic staff of the University of Port Harcourt
Writers from Rivers State